Koda Kumi has released more than 170 music videos since her debut in 2000. In other visual media, she has made four cameos: one in the Square Enix video game Final Fantasy X-2 as the character Lenne, one in the 2004 film Cutie Honey singing "The Theme of Sister Jill," one in the 2006 drama Busu no Hitomi ni Koishiteru, and one in the 2011 re-make of the Korean drama You're Beautiful, Ikemen desu ne. Kumi starred in the film Cherry Girl in 2006, a 52-minute movie filmed for her 2006 album, Black Cherry. She also acted in the 2007 film Saiyūki, the feature film version of the 2006 drama Saiyūki.

For her music videos, Kumi has actively worked with directors Shigeaki Kubo and Takashi Tadokoro, with both directing more than 15 of her videos each. From 2009, Kumi increasingly worked with directors Ryuji Seki and Hiroaki Higashi. Kumi has also worked multiple times with directors Tomoo Noda, Tetsuo Inoue and Ippei Morita. For her 2008 collaboration with Fergie, "That Ain't Cool," Kumi worked with American music video director Fatima Robinson. She enlisted the help of Robinson once more for the videos on her 2012 single Summer Trip, "Touch Down" and "LALALALALA." For the video of her cover of hide's "Pink Spider," Kumi worked with Japanese director Mika Ninagawa.

Music videos

2000s

2010s

2020s

Video albums

Compilation albums

Documentary albums

Music video albums

Live albums

Filmography
This is a chronologically-ordered list of games, films and television shows in which Kumi Koda has appeared.

Films

Television shows

Video games

Notes

References

Videography
Koda, Kumi